Songdalselva or Søgneelva or Songa is a river in Agder county, Norway. The  catchment area is located between the Otra river and Mandalselva river watersheds. The river runs through the villages of Hortemo, Nodeland, Volleberg, Tangvall, Åros, and Høllen.

The water flows are normally at their lowest in the summer and they're at their highest levels during the autumn and spring. There are only a few small lakes in the river system. The steep slopes down from the moors can create short and intense flood rapids. The river (here called Songa) flows through the Stallemodalen valley in Vennesla, and then falls into the Songdalen valley through a gorge at Underåsen.

Once in the Songdalen valley, it is called the Songdalselva. Here it receives more water from the right from the Gumpedalselva tributary. There is a short waterfall (Søgne waterfall) near the Søgne Landbruksskole. From that waterfall to the sea, the river is called the Søgneelva. The Songdalselva flows into the sea between the villages of Høllen and Åros in Kristiansand municipality.

Both salmon and sea trout are found in the river, and a fishing license is required for fishing along the river.

Environment
In the post-war years up until the 1980s, the river was thought of as an open sewer. Bathing and fishing were not recommended. Water quality improved by the time the sewer was led through pipes and cleansed before discharged to the sea. Today's (2016) environmental issue is mainly illegal garbage disposal and plastic waste from farming, accumulation along the banks and flowing into the ocean when the river is flooding.

In 1993, the watercourse was protected against hydropower development pursuant to Norwegian law, by development plans through Conservation Plan IV for waterways.

Media gallery

References 

Rivers of Agder
Geography of Kristiansand
Vennesla
Rivers of Norway